Plectrohyla sagorum (common name: arcane spikethumb frog) is a species of frog in the family Hylidae. It is found in the Sierra Madre de Chiapas from Chiapas (Mexico) to southwestern Guatemala, with a single record from northwestern El Salvador. Breeding takes place in streams. It is very rare in Mexico and El Salvador but abundant at two Guatemalan sites. It is threatened by habitat loss. Chytridiomycosis might also be a threat.

References

sagorum
Amphibians of El Salvador
Amphibians of Guatemala
Amphibians of Honduras
Amphibians described in 1941
Taxa named by Norman Edouard Hartweg
Taxonomy articles created by Polbot